Jerzy Broniec (born 6 February 1944) is a Polish former rower. He competed at the 1968 Summer Olympics, 1972 Summer Olympics and the 1976 Summer Olympics.

References

External links
 

1944 births
Living people
Polish male rowers
Olympic rowers of Poland
Rowers at the 1968 Summer Olympics
Rowers at the 1972 Summer Olympics
Rowers at the 1976 Summer Olympics
Sportspeople from Bydgoszcz
World Rowing Championships medalists for Poland